Chris Whitaker is a British author known for his books Tall Oaks, All the Wicked Girls, We Begin at the End, and The Forevers.

His debut novel, Tall Oaks, won the CWA John Creasey New Blood Dagger Award in 2017. We Begin at the End became a New York Times bestseller and received multiple awards, including the #1 Indie Next Pick, a Waterstones Thriller of the Month, a Barnes & Noble Book Club Pick and a Good Morning America Buzz Pick. It also won the CWA Gold Dagger, the Theakston Crime Novel of the Year and the Ned Kelly International Award in 2021. The book has also been translated into 28 languages.

In March 2021, it was announced that the rights to We Begin At The End have been acquired by Disney's 20th Television. 'Hamilton' director Thomas Kail and producing partner Jennifer Todd will develop the book for the Disney-owned studio.

Awards

Tall Oaks 
 2017: CWA New Blood Dagger

We Begin At The End 
 2021:
 CWA Gold Dagger
 Theakston Crime Novel of the Year
 Ned Kelly International Award

Personal life 
Before becoming an author, Whitaker worked as a trader in the City. He was born and raised in London, and now lives in Hertfordshire with his wife and three children. He also worked part-time at Bishop's Stortford Library.

Bibliography 
 2016: Tall Oaks, Twenty7, ISBN 1785770306
 2017: All The Wicked Girls, Zaffre, ISBN 1785761528
 2020: We Begin At The End, Zaffre, ISBN 1785769405
 2021: The Forevers, Hot Key Books, ISBN 1471409619

References 

21st-century British male writers
British crime writers
Year of birth missing (living people)
Living people
Writers from London
Writers from Hertfordshire